A unit citation is a formal, honorary mention by high authority of a military unit's specific and outstanding performance, notably in battle.

Similar mentions can also be made for individual soldiers.

Alternatively or concurrently, the unit can be awarded an honorary title, a mention on the flag or a decoration.

In France, since 1916, the fourragère (an ornamental colored cord) is worn on the uniform by the members of a unit which had received several citations.  This tradition has since spread to other countries.

Unit citations by country

Australia
Unit Citation for Gallantry 
Meritorious Unit Citation 
Group Bravery Citation – civilian award

Belgium
Croix de guerre WWII version (also an individual award)

Canada

Commander-in-Chief Unit Commendation (combat zone)
Canadian Forces' Unit Commendation (non-combat zone)

France
Légion d'honneur (also an individual award) 
Ordre de la Libération (also an individual award)
Médaille militaire (also an individual award)

Luxembourg
Luxembourg War Cross (also an individual award)

Netherlands
Military William Order (also an individual award)

South Korea
Republic of Korea Presidential Unit Citation

South Vietnam
Republic of Vietnam Presidential Unit Citation 
Vietnam Gallantry Cross Unit Citation (also an individual award) 
Vietnam Civil Actions Unit Citation (also an individual award)

Philippines
Philippine Presidential Unit Citation 
Barangay Presidential Unit Citation Badge
various single incident commemorative unit citations/badges.

Portugal
War Cross (also an individual award)

United States
Military (in order of precedence)

Others (alphabetical)

 Coast Guard Bicentennial Unit Commendation (United States Coast Guard)
 Merchant Marine Gallant Ship Citation (United States Merchant Marine)
 National Intelligence Meritorious Unit Citation (United States Intelligence Community)
 NGA Meritorious Unit Award (National Geospatial-Intelligence Agency), and its predecessor the NIMA Meritorious Unit Award (National Imagery and Mapping Agency)
 NOAA Unit Citation Award (NOAA Corps)
 Public Health Service Commissioned Corps:
 3 levels-PHS Presidential Unit Citation, PHS Outstanding Unit Citation, PHS Unit Commendation.  
 Also the PHS Bicentennial Unit Commendation Award
 Secretary of Transportation Outstanding Unit Award (Department of Transportation, also a pre-2003 award of the United States Coast Guard)
 Unit Award for Excellence of Service (United States Department of the Interior)
further, there are various unit awards of the National Guard and state defense forces

Sources and references
Nouveau Petit Larousse Illustré, 1951 (in French)

Military awards and decorations